Parry is a surname of Welsh origin originally derived from shortening 'ap Harry' (Welsh for "son of Harry"). 

People with the name include:

Alan Parry (born c. 1947), British football and athletics commentator
Albert Parry, Anglican Dean of St David's from 1940 to 1949
Albert Parry (academic) (1901–1992), historian
Bill Parry (mathematician) (1934–2006), British mathematician
Bill Parry (politician) (1878–1952), New Zealand politician
Bruce Parry (born 1969), British TV presenter and adventurer
Cecil Parry (1866–1901), English cricketer
Charles Parry (disambiguation)
Charles Christopher Parry (1823–1890), American botanist and mountaineer
David Parry (disambiguation)
Dick Parry (born 1942), English saxophonist
Edward Parry (disambiguation)
Frederic John Sidney Parry (1810–1885), English entomologist
Harold Parry (1896–1917), English World War I poet 
Hubert Parry (1848–1918), British composer
James Parry (born 1967), early web personality known as Kibo
John Parry (disambiguation)
Joseph Parry (1841–1903), Welsh composer and musician
Maurice Parry (1877–1935), Welsh footballer
Mark Parry (footballer) (born 1970), Welsh footballer
Mike Parry (born 1954), English journalist and radio presenter
Mike Parry (politician) (born 1953), American politician
Milman Parry (1902–1935), American scholar of epic poetry
Paul Parry (born 1980), Welsh footballer
Richard Parry (disambiguation)
Rick Parry (born 1955), British former chief executive of Liverpool Football Club and former head of the FA Premier League
Robert Parry (disambiguation)
Stephen Parry (disambiguation)
Thomas Parry (disambiguation)
Thomas Gambier Parry (1816–1888), British artist and art collector
William Parry (disambiguation)

Characters
 Will Parry (His Dark Materials), in the series His Dark Materials by Philip Pullman
 Stanislaus Grumman aka Colonel John Parry, father of Will Parry

Surnames of Welsh origin
Welsh-language surnames
English-language surnames
Patronymic surnames
Surnames from given names